Wang Yuan or Yuan Wang may refer to:

Wang Yuan (painter), Chinese landscape painter during the Yuan dynasty
Wang Yuan (mathematician) (1930–2021), Chinese mathematician, academician of the Chinese Academy of Sciences
Wang Yuan (palaeontologist), Chinese palaeontologist
Wang Yuan (athlete) (born 1976), 1993 World Junior record setter at 800 metres and 1500 metres
Roy Wang (born 2000), also known as Wang Yuan, Chinese artist

See also
Yuan Wang-class tracking ship